Massimo Zenildo Zappino (born 12 June 1981) is a former Brazilian footballer of Italian descent who played as a goalkeeper.

He also holds an Italian passport.

Playing career
In summer 2007, he was exchanged with Vincenzo Sicignano but failed to make permanent move. In summer 2008 he was signed by Foggia in exchange with Nunzio Di Roberto to Frosinone  In June Foggia acquired the remain 50% registration rights from Frosinone.

In July 2009 he signed a 2-year contract with Taranto as the joint-ownership bid accepted. It changed to definitive deal in late July. He then left for Como on free transfer.

On 2 September 2010 he joined Serie B club Varese He was the first choice keeper. The team finished fourth but failed to win the promotion playoffs.

On 1 November 2015 he made his debut in Serie A with Frosinone, eventually conceding 4 goals to Fiorentina.

After leaving Frosinone in 2018, he shortly joined Promozione amateur club Siracusa in 2019, being released just a few weeks after his signing due to physical and fitness problems, with no first team appearances.

Coaching career
After retiring as a player, Zappino stayed on in Syracuse and started a career as a goalkeeping coach and scout.

In 2022, he was hired as the new goalkeeping coach of Eccellenza Sicily amateurs Real Siracusa.

Personal life
Zappino was born in Pesqueira, Brazil to a poor family, and then successively adopted by an Italian family from Syracuse, Sicily.

Honours
Frosinone
Serie C1 runner-up and promotion playoff winner: 2006

References

External links
http://www#aclecco#it/scheda#php?id=66
http://www#gazzetta#it/Speciali/serie_b_2007/giocatori/zappino_mas#shtml

1981 births
Living people
Brazilian footballers
Italian footballers
Serie A players
Serie B players
Catania S.S.D. players
Frosinone Calcio players
A.C. ChievoVerona players
Calcio Foggia 1920 players
Calcio Lecco 1912 players
S.S.D. Pro Sesto players
Como 1907 players
Taranto F.C. 1927 players
S.S.D. Varese Calcio players
Association football goalkeepers
Brazilian people of Italian descent
Sportspeople from Pernambuco